Elections to Kesteven County Council were held on Saturday, 2 March 1946. Kesteven was one of three divisions of the historic county of Lincolnshire in England; it consisted of the ancient wapentakes (or hundreds) of Aswardhurn, Aveland, Beltisloe, Boothby Graffoe, Flaxwell, Langoe, Loveden, Ness, and Winnibriggs and Threo. The Local Government Act 1888 established Kesteven as an administrative county, governed by a Council; elections were held every three years from 1889, until it was abolished by the Local Government Act 1972, which established Lincolnshire County Council in its place.

For the 1946 election, the county was divided into sixty wards, ten of which accounted for the town of Grantham, five for Stamford, three for Sleaford and two for Bourne. Only twenty-six were contested and most of these were in the towns: every seat in Stamford and Bourne and all but one in Grantham and Sleaford. The results were extremely close in two wards: in Sleaford no. 3 there was a tie, forcing the returning officer to cast his ballot; and in Corby, the difference between the two candidates was one vote. In summarising the result, the Lincolnshire Echo stated that "politics play little part in Kesteven County Council affairs"; this was true at least insofar that Labour was the only political party to contest any of the wards. Having  won five seats, the remainder went to independent candidates.

Results

Ancaster

Bassingham

Bennington

Billingborough

Billinghay

Bourne no. 1

Bourne no. 2

Bracebridge

Branston

Brytham

Caythorpe

Claypole

Colsterworth

Corby

Cranwell

Deeping St James

Dunston

Gonerby and Barrowby

Grantham no. 1

Grantham no. 2

Basford was elected Mayor of Grantham and became an alderman later in 1946, forcing her to vacate the seat. The Labour candidate Elizabeth Frances Bullimore was the only person nominated to replace her and so took up the seat in March 1947.

Grantham no. 3

Grantham no. 4

Grantham no. 5

Grantham no. 6

Grantham no. 7

Grantham no. 8

Grantham no. 9

Grantham no. 10

Heckington

Helpringham

Kyme

Leadenham

Market Deeping

Martin

Metheringham

Morton

Navenby

North Hykeham

Osbournby

Ponton

Rippingale

Ropsley

Ruskington

Scopwick

Skellingthorpe

Sleaford no. 1

Sleaford no. 2

Sleaford no. 3

Stamford no. 1

Stamford no. 2

Stamford no. 3

Stamford no. 4

Stamford no. 5

Swinderby

Thurlby

Uffington

Washingborough

Welby

Wilsford

Woolsthorpe

References

1946
1946 English local elections
20th century in Lincolnshire